The Nathaniel Conklin House is a historic house located at 280 Deer Park Avenue in Babylon, Suffolk County, New York.

Description
It was built in 1803 and consists of a rectangular main block and a smaller back extension. It has a two-story plus attic, five-bay-wide, frame building with an attached kitchen wing of one and one half stories. It was moved to its present site in 1871. It has been owned and operated by the American Red Cross since 1945. As described by state records, the house is notable in its attention to craftsmanship. "The weather sheathing of this 1803 house is of hand-split and dressed shingles (except under the porch). These are butt-nailed with cut nails set and puttied."

National Register of Historic Places
It was added to the National Register of Historic Places on December 8, 1988.

References

External links

Historic American Buildings Survey in New York (state)
Houses on the National Register of Historic Places in New York (state)
Federal architecture in New York (state)
Houses completed in 1803
National Register of Historic Places in Babylon (town), New York
Houses in Suffolk County, New York
1803 establishments in New York (state)